Nadia Quagliotto (born 22 March 1997) is an Italian racing cyclist, who currently rides for UCI Women's Continental Team .

Major results
2022 
 8th Trofeo Oro in Euro–Women's Bike Race

See also
 List of 2016 UCI Women's Teams and riders

References

External links
 

1997 births
Living people
Italian female cyclists
People from Montebelluna
Cyclists from the Province of Treviso